Thomas Allen Phelps (born March 4, 1974) is an American former professional baseball pitcher in Major League Baseball. He is currently a coach in the Miami Marlins organization.

Career

Playing career
Phelps was a member of the Marlins team that won the 2003 World Series, although he did not appear in the series. In , he pitched in 29 games with the Milwaukee Brewers, recording no wins and two losses. In , he signed a minor league deal with the New York Yankees and started 17 games for their Triple-A affiliate, the Columbus Clippers, finishing the season with a 7–4 record and a 4.45 ERA.

Coaching career
He is currently the assistant minor league pitching coordinator for the Miami Marlins.

See also
List of Major League Baseball players from South Korea

References

External links

1974 births
Living people
Albany Polecats players
Albuquerque Isotopes players
American baseball coaches
American expatriate baseball players in Canada
Burlington Bees players
Calgary Cannons players
Columbus Clippers players
Erie SeaWolves players
Florida Marlins players
Gulf Coast Marlins players
Harrisburg Senators players
Jacksonville Suns players
Jamestown Expos players
Jupiter Hammerheads players
Major League Baseball pitchers
Major League Baseball players from South Korea
Milwaukee Brewers players
Minor league baseball coaches
Nashville Sounds players
Baseball players from Seoul
Toledo Mud Hens players
West Palm Beach Expos players